In religious belief, a saint is a person who is recognized as having an exceptional degree of holiness, likeness, or closeness to God. However, the use of the term saint depends on the context and denomination. In Catholic, Eastern Orthodox, Anglican, Oriental Orthodox, and Lutheran doctrine, all of their faithful deceased in Heaven are considered to be saints, but some are considered worthy of greater honor or emulation. Official ecclesiastical recognition, and consequently a public cult of veneration, is conferred on some denominational saints through the process of canonization in the Catholic Church or glorification in the Eastern Orthodox Church after their approval.

While the English word saint originated in Christianity, historians of religion tend to use the appellation "in a more general way to refer to the state of special holiness that many religions attribute to certain people", referring to the Jewish tzadik, the Islamic walī, the Hindu rishi or Sikh Bhagat and guru, the Shintoist kami, the Taoist shengren, and the Buddhist arhat or bodhisattva also as saints. Depending on the religion, saints are recognized either by official ecclesiastical declaration, as in the Catholic faith, or by popular acclamation (see folk saint).

General characteristics 
The English word saint comes from the Latin sanctus, with the Greek equivalent being ἅγιος (hagios) 'holy'. The word ἅγιος appears 229 times in the Greek New Testament, and its English translation 60 times in the corresponding text of the King James Version of the Bible.

The word sanctus was originally a technical one in ancient Roman religion, but due to its globalized use in Christianity the modern word saint is now also used as a translation of comparable terms for persons "worthy of veneration for their holiness or sanctity" in other religions.

Many religions also use similar concepts (but different terminology) to venerate persons worthy of some honor. Author John A. Coleman of the Graduate Theological Union, Berkeley, California, wrote that saints across various cultures and religions have the following family resemblances:

 exemplary model
 extraordinary teacher
 wonder worker or source of benevolent power
 intercessor
 a life often refusing material attachments or comforts
 possession of a special and revelatory relation to the holy.

The anthropologist Lawrence Babb in an article about Indian guru Sathya Sai Baba asks the question "Who is a saint?", and responds by saying that in the symbolic infrastructure of some religions, there is the image of a certain extraordinary spiritual king's "miraculous powers", to whom frequently a certain moral presence is attributed. These saintly figures, he asserts, are "the focal points of spiritual force-fields". They exert "powerful attractive influence on followers but touch the inner lives of others in transforming ways as well".

Christianity

Catholic Church 

According to the Catholic Church, a saint may be anyone in Heaven, whether recognized on Earth or not, who forms the "great cloud of witnesses" (Hebrews 12:1). These "may include our own mothers, grandmothers or other loved ones (cf. 2 Tim 1:5)" who may have not always lived perfect lives, but "amid their faults and failings they kept moving forward and proved pleasing to the Lord". The title Saint denotes a person who has been formally canonized—that is, officially and authoritatively declared a saint, by the church as holder of the Keys of the Kingdom of Heaven, and is therefore believed to be in Heaven by the grace of God. There are many persons that the church believes to be in Heaven who have not been formally canonized and who are otherwise titled saints because of the fame of their holiness. Sometimes the word saint also denotes living Christians.

According to the Catechism of the Catholic Church, "The patriarchs, prophets, and certain other Old Testament figures have been and always will be honored as saints in all the church's liturgical traditions."

In his book Saint of the Day, editor Leonard Foley says this: the "[Saints'] surrender to God's love was so generous an approach to the total surrender of Jesus that the Church recognizes them as heroes and heroines worthy to be held up for our inspiration. They remind us that the Church is holy, can never stop being holy and is called to show the holiness of God by living the life of Christ."

The Catholic Church teaches that it does not "make" or "create" saints, but rather recognizes them. Proofs of heroic virtue required in the process of beatification will serve to illustrate in detail the general principles exposed above upon proof of their holiness or likeness to God.

On 3 January 993, Pope John XV became the first pope to proclaim a person a saint from outside the diocese of Rome: on the petition of the German ruler, he had canonized Bishop Ulrich of Augsburg. Before that time, the popular "cults", or venerations, of saints had been local and spontaneous and were confirmed by the local bishop. Pope John XVIII subsequently permitted a cult of five Polish martyrs. Pope Benedict VIII later declared the Armenian hermit Simeon of Mantua to be a saint, but it was not until the pontificate of Pope Innocent III that the Popes reserved to themselves the exclusive authority to canonize saints, so that local bishops needed the confirmation of the Pope. Walter of Pontoise was the last person in Western Europe to be canonized by an authority other than the Pope: Hugh de Boves, the Archbishop of Rouen, canonized him in 1153. Thenceforth a decree of Pope Alexander III in 1170 reserved the prerogative of canonization to the Pope, insofar as the Latin Church was concerned.

Alban Butler published Lives of the Saints in 1756, including a total of 1,486 saints. The latest revision of this book, edited by Herbert Thurston and Donald Attwater, contains the lives of 2,565 saints. Monsignor Robert Sarno, an official of the Dicastery for the Causes of Saints of the Holy See, expressed that it is impossible to give an exact number of saints.

The veneration of saints, in Latin cultus, or the "cult of the Saints", describes a particular popular devotion or entrustment of one's self to a particular saint or group of saints. Although the term worship is sometimes used, it is only used with the older English connotation of honoring or respecting (dulia) a person. According to the church, Divine worship is in the strict sense reserved only to God (latria) and never to the saints. One is permitted to ask the saints to intercede or pray to God for persons still on Earth, just as one can ask someone on Earth to pray for him.

A saint may be designated as a patron saint of a particular cause, profession, or locale, or invoked as a protector against specific illnesses or disasters, sometimes by popular custom and sometimes by official declarations of the church. Saints are not believed to have power of their own, but only that granted by God. Relics of saints are respected, or venerated, similar to the veneration of holy images and icons. The practice in past centuries of venerating relics of saints with the intention of obtaining healing from God through their intercession is taken from the early church. For example, an American deacon claimed in 2000 that John Henry Newman (then blessed) interceded with God to cure him of a physical illness. The deacon, Jack Sullivan, asserted that after addressing Newman he was cured of spinal stenosis in a matter of hours. In 2009, a panel of theologians concluded that Sullivan's recovery was the result of his prayer to Newman. According to the church, to be deemed a miracle, "a medical recovery must be instantaneous, not attributable to treatment, disappear for good."

Once a person has been canonized, the deceased body of the saint is considered holy as a relic. The remains of saints are called holy relics and are usually used in churches. Saints' personal belongings may also be used as relics. Some of the saints have a special symbol by tradition, e.g., Saint Lawrence, deacon and martyr, is identified by a gridiron because he is believed to have been burned to death on one. This symbol is found, for instance, in the Canadian heraldry of the office responsible for the St. Lawrence Seaway.

Stages of canonization 
Formal canonization is a lengthy process, often of many years or even centuries. There are four major steps to become a saint. The first stage in this process is an investigation of the candidate's life by an expert. After this, the official report on the candidate is submitted to the bishop of the pertinent diocese and more study is undertaken. The information is then sent to the Dicastery for the Causes of Saints of the Holy See for evaluation at the universal level of the church. If the application is approved the candidate may be granted the title Venerable (stage 2). Further investigation, step 3, may lead to the candidate's beatification with the title Blessed, which is elevation to the class of the Beati. Next, and at a minimum, proof of two important miracles obtained from God through the intercession of the candidate are required for formal canonization as a saint. These miracles must be posthumous. Finally, in the last stage, after all of these procedures are complete, the Pope may canonize the candidate as a saint for veneration by the universal church.

Eastern Orthodoxy 

In the Eastern Orthodox Church, a saint is defined as anyone who is in Heaven, whether recognized here on Earth, or not. By this definition, Adam and Eve, Moses, the various prophets, except for the angels and archangels are all given the title of "Saint". Sainthood in the Orthodox Church does not necessarily reflect a moral model, but the communion with God: there are countless examples of people who lived in great sin and became saints by humility and repentance, such as Mary of Egypt, Moses the Ethiopian, and Dysmas, the repentant thief who was crucified. Therefore, a more complete Eastern Orthodox definition of what a saint is, has to do with the way that saints, through their humility and their love of humankind, saved inside them the entire Church, and loved all people.

Orthodox belief considers that God reveals saints through answered prayers and other miracles. Saints are usually recognized by a local community, often by people who directly knew them. As their popularity grows they are often then recognized by the entire Church. The word canonization means that a Christian has been found worthy to have his name placed in the canon (official list) of saints of the Church. The formal process of recognition involves deliberation by a synod of bishops. The Orthodox Church does not require the manifestation of miracles; what is required is evidence of a virtuous life.

If the ecclesiastical review is successful, this is followed by a service of Glorification in which the Saint is given a day on the Church calendar to be celebrated by the entire Church. This does not, however, make the person a saint; the person already was a saint and the Church ultimately recognized it.

As a general rule, only clergy will touch relics in order to move them or carry them in procession, however, in veneration the faithful will kiss the relic to show love and respect toward the saint. The altar in an Orthodox Church usually contains relics of saints, often of martyrs. Church interiors are covered with the Icons of saints. When an Orthodox Christian venerates icons of a saint he is venerating the image of God which he sees in the saint.

Because the Church shows no true distinction between the living and the dead, as the saints are considered to be alive in Heaven, saints are referred to as if they are still alive, and are venerated, not worshiped. They are believed to be able to intercede for salvation and help mankind either through direct communion with God or by personal intervention.

In the Eastern Orthodox Church, the title Ὅσιος, Hosios (f. Ὁσία Hosia) is also used. This is a title attributed to saints who had lived a monastic or eremitic life equivalent to the more usual title of "Saint".

Oriental Orthodoxy 
The Oriental Orthodox churches ‒ the Armenian Apostolic Church, the Coptic Orthodox Church of Alexandria, the Tewahedo Church, the Malankara Orthodox Syrian Church, and the Syriac Orthodox Church ‒ follow a canonization process unique to each church. The Coptic Orthodox Church of Alexandria, for example, has the requirement that at least 50 years must pass following a prospective saint's death before the Coptic Orthodox Church's pope can canonize the saint.

Anglicanism 

In the Anglican Communion and the Continuing Anglican movement, the title of Saint refers to a person who has been elevated by popular opinion as a pious and holy person. The saints are seen as models of holiness to be imitated, and as a "cloud of witnesses" that strengthen and encourage the believer during his or her spiritual journey. The saints are seen as elder brothers and sisters in Christ. Official Anglican creeds recognize the existence of the saints in heaven.

In high-church contexts, such as Anglo-Catholicism, a saint is generally one to whom has been attributed (and who has generally demonstrated) a high level of holiness and sanctity. In this use, a saint is therefore not merely a believer, but one who has been transformed by virtue. In Catholicism, a saint is a special sign of God's activity. The veneration of saints is sometimes misunderstood to be worship, in which case it is derisively termed "hagiolatry".

So far as invocation of the saints is concerned, one of the Church of England's Articles of Religion "Of Purgatory" condemns "the Romish Doctrine concerning...(the) Invocation of Saints" as "a fond thing vainly invented, and grounded upon no warranty of Scripture, but rather repugnant to the Word of God". Anglo-Catholics in Anglican provinces using the Articles often make a distinction between a "Romish" and a "Patristic" doctrine concerning the invocation of saints, permitting the latter in accordance with Article XXII. Indeed, the theologian E.J. Bicknell stated that the Anglican view acknowledges that the term "invocation may mean either of two things: the simple request to a saint for his prayers (intercession), 'ora pro nobis', or a request for some particular benefit. In medieval times the saints had come to be regarded as themselves the authors of blessings. Such a view was condemned but the former was affirmed."

Some Anglicans and Anglican churches, particularly Anglo-Catholics, personally ask prayers of the saints. However, such a practice is seldom found in any official Anglican liturgy. Unusual examples of it are found in The Korean Liturgy 1938, the liturgy of the Diocese of Guiana 1959 and The Melanesian English Prayer Book.

Anglicans believe that the only effective Mediator between the believer and God the Father, in terms of redemption and salvation, is God the Son, Jesus Christ. Historical Anglicanism has drawn a distinction between the intercession of the saints and the invocation of the saints. The former was generally accepted in Anglican doctrine, while the latter was generally rejected. There are some, however, in Anglicanism, who do beseech the saints' intercession. Those who beseech the saints to intercede on their behalf make a distinction between mediator and intercessor, and claim that asking for the prayers of the saints is no different in kind than asking for the prayers of living Christians. Anglican Catholics understand sainthood in a more Catholic or Orthodox way, often praying for intercessions from the saints and celebrating their feast days.

According to the Church of England, a saint is one who is sanctified, as it translates in the Authorized King James Version (1611) 2 Chronicles 6:41: Now therefore arise, O  God, into thy resting place, thou, and the ark of thy strength: let thy priests, O  God, be clothed with salvation, and let thy saints rejoice in goodness.

Lutheranism 

In the Lutheran Church, all Christians, whether in Heaven or on Earth, are regarded as saints. However, the church still recognizes and honors specific saints, including some of those recognized by the Catholic Church, but in a qualified way: according to the Augsburg Confession, the term saint is used in the manner of the Catholic Church only insofar as to denote a person who received exceptional grace, was sustained by faith, and whose good works are to be an example to any Christian. Traditional Lutheran belief accounts that prayers to the saints are prohibited, as they are not mediators of redemption. But, Lutherans do believe that saints pray for the Christian Church in general. Philip Melanchthon, the author of the Apology of the Augsburg Confession, approved honoring the saints by saying they are honored in three ways:
1. By thanking God for examples of His mercy;
2. By using the saints as examples for strengthening our faith; and
3. By imitating their faith and other virtues.

The Lutheran Churches also have liturgical calendars in which they honor individuals as saints.

The intercession of saints was criticized in the Augsburg Confession, Article XXI: Of the Worship of the Saints. This criticism was rebutted by the Catholic side in the Confutatio Augustana, which in turn was rebutted by the Lutheran side in the Apology to the Augsburg Confession.

Methodism 

While Methodists as a whole do not venerate saints, they do honor and admire them. Methodists believe that all Christians are saints, but mainly use the term to refer to biblical figures, Christian leaders, and martyrs of the faith. Many Methodist churches are named after saints—such as the Twelve Apostles, John Wesley, etc.—although most are named after geographical locations associated with an early circuit or prominent location. Methodist congregations observe All Saints' Day. Many encourage the study of saints, that is, the biographies of holy people.

The 14th Article of Religion in the United Methodist Book of Discipline states:
The Romish doctrine concerning purgatory, pardon, worshiping, and adoration, as well of images as of relics, and also invocation of saints, is a fond thing, vainly invented, and grounded upon no warrant of Scripture, but repugnant to the Word of God.

Other Protestantism 

In many Protestant churches, the word saint is used more generally to refer to anyone who is a Christian. This is similar in usage to Paul's numerous references in the New Testament of the Bible. In this sense, anyone who is within the Body of Christ (i.e., a professing Christian) is a saint because of their relationship with Christ Jesus. Many Protestants consider intercessory prayers to the saints to be idolatry, since what they perceive to be an application of divine worship that should be given only to God himself is being given to other believers, dead or alive.

Within some Protestant traditions, saint is also used to refer to any born-again Christian. Many emphasize the traditional New Testament meaning of the word, preferring to write "saint" to refer to any believer, in continuity with the doctrine of the priesthood of all believers.

The Church of Jesus Christ of Latter-day Saints 
The use of "saint" within the Church of Jesus Christ of Latter-day Saints (LDS Church) is similar to the Protestant tradition. In the New Testament, saints are all those who have entered into the Christian covenant of baptism. The qualification "latter-day" refers to the doctrine that members are living in the latter days before the Second Coming of Christ, and is used to distinguish the members of the church, which considers itself the restoration of the ancient Christian church. Members are therefore often referred to as "Latter-day Saints" or "LDS", and among themselves as "saints".

Other religions 
In some theological literature, the use of the term saint tends to be used in non-Christian contexts as well. In many religions, there are people who have been recognized within their tradition as having fulfilled the highest aspirations of religious teaching. In English, the term saint is often used to translate this idea from many world religions. The Jewish hasid or tsaddiq, the Islamic qidees, the Zoroastrian fravashi, the Hindu rsi or guru, the Buddhist arahant or bodhisattva, the Daoist shengren, the Shinto kami, and others have all been referred to as saints.

African diaspora 

Cuban Santería, Haitian Vodou, Trinidad Orisha-Shango, Brazilian Umbanda, Candomblé, and other similar syncretist religions adopted the Catholic saints, or at least the images of the saints, and applied their own spirits/deities to them. They are worshiped in churches (where they appear as saints) and in religious festivals, where they appear as the deities. The name santería was originally a pejorative term for those whose worship of saints deviated from Catholic norms.

Buddhism 

Buddhists in both the Theravada and Mahayana traditions hold the Arhats in special esteem, as well as highly developed Bodhisattvas.

Tibetan Buddhists hold the tulkus (reincarnates of deceased eminent practitioners) as living saints on earth.

Hinduism 

Hindu saints are those recognized by Hindus as showing a great degree of holiness and sanctity. Hinduism has a long tradition of stories and poetry about saints. There is no formal canonization process in Hinduism, but over time, many men and women have reached the status of saints among their followers and among Hindus in general. Unlike in Christianity, Hinduism does not canonize people as saints after death, but they can be accepted as saints during their lifetime. Hindu saints have often renounced the world, and are variously called gurus, sadhus, rishis, devarishis, rajarshis, saptarishis, brahmarshis, swamis, pundits, purohits, pujaris, acharyas, pravaras, yogis, yoginis, and other names.

Some Hindu saints are given god-like status, being seen as incarnations of Vishnu, Shiva, Devi, and other aspects of the Divine—this can happen during their lifetimes, or sometimes many years after their deaths. This explains another common name for Hindu saints: godmen.

Islam 

Besides prophets, according to Islam, saints possess blessings (Arabic: بركة, "baraka") and can perform miracles (Arabic: كرامات, Karāmāt). Saints rank lower than prophets, and they do not intercede for people on the Day of Judgment. However, both the tombs of prophets and saints are visited frequently (Ziyarat). People would seek the advice of a saint in their quest for spiritual fulfilment. Unlike saints in Christianity, Muslim saints are usually acknowledged informally by consensus of common people, not by scholars. Unlike prophets, women like Rabia of Basra were accepted as saints.

Islam has had a rich history of veneration of saints (often called wali, which literally means 'Friend [of God]'), which has declined in some parts of the Islamic world in the twentieth century due to the influence of the various streams of Salafism. In Sunni Islam, the veneration of saints became a very common form of devotion early on, and saints came to be defined in the eighth-century as a group of "special people chosen by God and endowed with exceptional gifts, such as the ability to work miracles." The classical Sunni scholars came to recognize and honor these individuals as venerable people who were both "loved by God and developed a close relationship of love to Him." "Belief in the miracles of saints (karāmāt al-awliyāʾ) ... [became a] requirement in Sunni Islam [during the classical period]," with even medieval critics of the ubiquitous practice of grave visitation like Ibn Taymiyyah emphatically declaring: "The miracles of saints are absolutely true and correct, and acknowledged by all Muslim scholars. The Quran has pointed to it in different places, and the sayings of the Prophet have mentioned it, and whoever denies the miraculous power of saints are innovators or following innovators." The vast majority of saints venerated in the classical Sunni world were the Sufis, who were all Sunni mystics who belonged to one of the four orthodox legal schools of Sunni law.

Veneration of saints eventually became one of the most widespread Sunni practices for more than a millennium, before it was opposed in the twentieth century by the Salafi movement, whose various streams regard it as "being both un-Islamic and backwards ... rather than the integral part of Islam which they were for over a millennium." In a manner similar to the Protestant Reformation, the specific traditional practices which Salafism has tried to curtail in both Sunni and Shia contexts include those of the veneration of saints, visiting their graves, seeking their intercession, and honoring their relics. As Christopher Taylor has remarked: "[Throughout Islamic history] a vital dimension of Islamic piety was the veneration of Muslim saints…. [Due, however to] certain strains of thought within the Islamic tradition itself, particularly pronounced in the nineteenth and the twentieth centuries ... [some modern day] Muslims have either resisted acknowledging the existence of Muslim saints altogether or have viewed their presence and veneration as unacceptable deviations."

Judaism 

The term Tzadik, 'righteous', and its associated meanings developed in rabbinic thought from its Talmudic contrast with Hasid, 'pious', to its exploration in ethical literature, and its esoteric spiritualization in Kabbalah. In Hasidic Judaism, the institution of the Tzadik assumed central importance, combining former elite mysticism with social movement for the first time.

Sikhism 

The concept of sant or bhagat is found in North Indian religious thought including Sikhism, most notably in the Guru Granth Sahib. Figures such as Kabir, Ravidas, Namdev, and others are known as Sants or Bhagats. The term Sant is applied in the Sikh and related communities to beings that have attained enlightenment through God realization and spiritual union with God via repeatedly reciting the name of God (Naam Japo). Countless names of God exist. In Sikhism, Naam (spiritual internalization of God's name) is commonly attained through the name of Waheguru, which translates to "Wondrous Guru".

Sikhs are encouraged to follow the congregation of a Sant (Sadh Sangat) or "The Company of the Holy". Sants grace the Sadh Sangat with knowledge of the Divine God, and how to take greater steps towards obtaining spiritual enlightenment through Naam. Sants are to be distinguished from "Guru" (such as Guru Nanak) who have compiled the path to God enlightenment in the Sri Guru Granth Sahib. Sikhism states however, that any beings that have become one with God are considered synonymous with God. As such, the fully realized Sant, Guru, and God are considered one.

See also 

 Calendar of saints
 Communion of saints
 Hagiography
 Hallow
Mar
 Latter Day Saint movement
 List of bodhisattvas
 List of canonizations
 List of Christian saints
 List of saints from Africa
 List of American saints and beatified people
 List of Breton saints
 List of Canadian Catholic saints
 List of Coptic saints
 List of saints of India
 List of saints of the Augustinian Order
 List of saints of the Benedictine Order
 List of saints of the Carmelite Order
 List of saints of the Dominican Order
 List of saints of the Franciscan Order
 List of saints of the Society of Jesus
 List of Russian saints
 List of Hindu gurus and sants
 List of Sufi saints
 Martyrology
 Sage (philosophy)
 Saint Companions
 Secular saint

References

Citations

Sources 

 Beyer, Jürgen, et al., eds. Confessional sanctity (c. 1550 – c. 1800). Mainz: Philipp von Zabern, 2003.
 Bruhn, Siglind. Saints in the Limelight: Representations of the Religious Quest on the Post-1945 Operatic Stage. Hillsdale, New York: Pendragon Press, 2003. .
 Cunningham, Lawrence S. The Meaning of Saints. San Francisco: Harper & Row, 1980.
 Hawley, John Stratton, ed. Saints and Virtues. Berkeley: University of California Press, 1987. .
 Hein, David. "Saints: Holy, Not Tame". Sewanee Theological Review 49 (2006): 204–217.
 Jean-Luc Deuffic (ed.), Reliques et sainteté dans l'espace médiéval 
 O'Malley, Vincent J. Ordinary Suffering of Extraordinary Saints, 1999. .
 Perham, Michael. The Communion of Saints. London: Alcuin Club/SPCK, 1980.
 Woodward, Kenneth L. Making Saints. New York: Simon & Schuster, 1996.

Further reading 
 
 Gallick, Sarah (2014). 50 Saints Everyone Should Know. Wise Media Group. .  E-book.

External links 

 Today's Saints on the Calendar
 Saints' Books Library
 Orthodox Saints and Martyrs of the Ancient Church
 Saints and Their Legends: A Selection of Saints
 Biographies of Saints and Gurus in the Indian Tradition

 
 
Religious terminology
Titles and occupations in Hinduism